Alexander Daas is a luxury eyewear company. The company's sunglasses and eyeglasses are made using materials such as Italian and Japanese acetates and titanium. 

The eyewear has been featured in film and television, appearing in movies such as  Need For Speed and shows such as NCIS, CSI: Crime Scene Investigation,  Good Girls, Life in Pieces, The Real O'Neals, and  Marlon.

Alexander Daas eyewear has been worn by celebrities including Mark-Paul Gosselaar, Michael Keaton, Sammy Hagar, Forest Whitaker, Malcolm McDowell, Jenny McCarthy, Andy Samberg, and Zendaya.

Background
Alexander Daas initially launched in San Francisco but is now headquartered in Los Angeles. They are known for, although not limited to, their selection of small PD (pupillary distance) eyewear for narrower faces/petite eyeglasses. The brand and company was founded by Alex Feldman, an American eyewear designer, stylist and optician.

Alexander Daas boutiques

Alexander Daas has its own flagship store in Los Angeles, a sister store in San Francisco called San Francisco Optics (est. 1979), with previous pop up shops in San Diego and Studio City. These stores sell eyewear brands including Alexander Daas, Mykita, Barton Perreira, Garrett Leight, Moscot, Thierry Lasry, Celine, Salt and Matsuda.

Alexander Daas stores offer optical services and specialize in their styling consultation to fit the proper glasses to a face.

The Los Angeles store is located in Larchmont Village.

References

External links
  Alexander Daas Official site

Eyewear brands
Eyewear brands of the United States
Companies based in Los Angeles